Liiv is a common Estonian surname (meaning sand), with notable bearers including:

Daimar Liiv (born 1966), politician
Jakob Liiv (1859–1938), poet and writer
Juhan Liiv (1864–1913), poet
Marten Liiv (born 1996), speed skater
 (1946–2009), poet and literary critic
Urmas Eero Liiv (born 1966), film and television director

See also
Liv (disambiguation)
Liiva (disambiguation)

Estonian-language surnames